Josefina Aguilar (born 1945) is a Mexican folk artist from Ocotlán de Morelos, Oaxaca.  A member of the Aguilar family, she is best known for her small clay figurines called muñecas (dolls), an artform she learned from her mother.  Aguilar uses red clay to create depictions of everyday village activities, religious and folkloric scenes, famous figures, and special Day of the Dead statues.  Collectors of her work include Nelson Rockefeller, who discovered her work on a trip to Oaxaca in 1975, as well as repeat visitors to Oaxaca who come to see her latest work.  Aguilar says each figurine she makes is unique.  She became blind in 2014 and now uses touch to create her art.  One of her major collectors quoted her as saying "It's not the eyes. It's the hand and the brain."

Biography 
Josefina Aguilar was mentored by her mother Isaura Alcantara Díaz and her grandmother.  She began learning her craft from them when she was six years old. Aguilar's mother died in 1968, at the age of 43. Her father died in 1976. In teaching her daughters, Aguilar's mother had hoped to pass on a craft and expertise that would provide for them. In her early twenties, Aguilar began to receive international press on her work.  Aguilar's sisters Guillermina, Irene, and Concepcion also became accomplished sculptors, each with their own specialties.  By the beginning of the 21st century, Josefina Aguilar was the matriarch of a family with nine members working in clay, including her sons Demetrio and Jose Juan Garcia.  Other family members focus on painting or other tasks.

Process 
Aguilar's family dig the clay they use from a pit in a field outside of Ocotlán de Morelos.  To get the quality clay required they have to dig down 10 or 12 feet.  They soak the clay, lay a palm mat over it, and walk on it to press out the bubbles.  While sculpting, Aguilar sits on her heels on a flat stone.  Finished figures have to dry indoors for a week (direct sunlight would cause them to crack) before the family fires them in a rustic wooden kiln for nine hours.  Many figures are lost to breakage.  Those that survive the firing process have to cool overnight before they can be painted.  The Aguilars sell their artwork on trestle tables set up in the open courtyard of their five-family complex. Aguilar and her husband purchased the land where the clay for her work is sourced. Previously, the family paid weekly for the clay they used from this land.

Work in museums 
Josefina Aguilar's work is displayed in the Museum of International Folk Art in Santa Fe, the Mexic-Arte Museum in Austin, TX, the San Antonio Museum of Art, and the Mexican Museum in San Francisco.

Heard Museum in Phoenix, AZ

In other media 
Children's book author Jeanette Winter has written and illustrated a counting book inspired by Aguilar's life and work.

References

Living people
Folk artists
Mexican potters
Mexican sculptors
People from Oaxaca
Women potters
Mexican women ceramists
1945 births